The following are the national records in athletics in Cameroon maintained by Cameroon's national athletics federation: Fédération Camerounaise d'Athlétisme (FCA).

Outdoor

Key to tables:

h = hand timing

A = affected by altitude

NWI = no wind information

OT = oversized track (> 200m in circumference)

Men

Women

Mixed

Indoor

Men

Women

Notes

References
General
World Athletics Statistic Handbook 2019: National Outdoor Records
World Athletics Statistic Handbook 2018: National Indoor Records
Specific

External links

Cameroon
Records
Athletics